Strettle is a surname. Notable people with the surname include:

 David Strettle (born 1983), English rugby union player
 Sam Strettle (1886–1926), English footballer

References